Miniature landscape is a traditional art in East Asia of creating tiny versions of the natural environment such as gardens. It may refer to:

Japan
Saikei
Bonsai
Bonsai cultivation and care
Bonkei
Bonseki

Others
Penjing (China)
Hòn Non Bộ (Vietnam)